Laurent Bouzereau is a French-American documentary filmmaker, producer, and author.

Life and career
Laurent Bouzereau directed and produced the HBO feature length documentary Mama's Boy: A stories From Our Americas, based on the best-selling memoir by Dustin Lance Black.  The film was produced by LD Entertainment, Amblin Television, Playtone and Nedland Media.

Bouzereau is also the director / co-producer of Natalie Wood: What Remains Behind, for HBO and Amblin Television. The film was selected at the 2020 Sundance Film Festival and presented in the Documentary Premiere selection.  He directed and co-produced the acclaimed Netflix series Five Came Back, executive produced by Steven Spielberg and Amblin Television, based on the best-selling book by Mark Harris, with an Emmy-winning narration by Meryl Streep. The documentary features Francis Ford Coppola, Guillermo del Toro, Paul Greengrass, Lawrence Kasdan, and Steven Spielberg.

Bouzereau was born and raised in a suburb of Paris, France. He began his career in New York as a freelance journalist and author with The De Palma Cut while working in publicity and promotion for the independent distribution company Spectrafilm. Upon moving to Hollywood, he was story editor and graduated to director of development for Bette Midler's production company, All Girl Productions. He got his start in home entertainment when he recorded audio commentary for the Criterion Collection on the LaserDisc for Carrie in 1991. In 1995, he produced his first of many documentaries for Steven Spielberg when he was asked to work on the LaserDisc restoration of the film 1941. That year he also produced The Making of Steven Spielberg's 'Jaws', a feature-length documentary that was included on the LaserDisc release of Jaws in 1995, and later on the DVD and Blu-ray releases of the film. Following the success of this documentary, Bouzereau continued to produce retrospective documentaries for Laserdisc, including the making of Scarface and E.T.: The Extra Terrestrial in 1996, the making of Psycho in 1997 and the making of Close Encounters of the Third Kind in 1998. In 2002, for the production of A.I. Artificial Intelligence, he began documenting the filmmaking process on-set.

Bouzereau has produced documentaries on the making-of some of the biggest films in the history of cinema, by some of the most acclaimed directors of all-time. He has produced most of the documentaries on the making of Steven Spielberg's films. In total, he has documented over 150 films, including the Indiana Jones and Jurassic Park film franchises. Among the many titles include American Graffiti by George Lucas, Titanic and Avatar by James Cameron, the Universal and Warners Bros. Alfred Hitchcock collections, Lawrence of Arabia and The Bridge on the River Kwai by David Lean, Taxi Driver, Raging Bull and Casino by Martin Scorsese, Scarface, Carrie, and Dressed to Kill by Brian De Palma, Cruising and The Exorcist by William Friedkin, Back to the Future by Robert Zemeckis, Reds by Warren Beatty, Chinatown and Tess by Roman Polanski, and The Last Picture Show by Peter Bogdanovich.

As an author, Bouzereau's credits include Steven Spielberg: The First Ten Years (2023), West Side Story: The Making of the Steven Spielberg Film, Hitchcock: Piece by Piece, The Art of Bond, The New York Times Best-Seller The Making of Star Wars, Episode I – The Phantom Menace, Star Wars: The Annotated Screenplays,  The Cutting Room Floor: Movie Scenes Which Never Made It To The Screen, Ultra Violent Movies: From Sam Peckinpah to Quentin Tarantino and The De Palma Cut: The Films of America's Most Controversial Director.

Bouzereau wrote, directed and produced the documentary on legendary film producer Richard D. Zanuck entitled Don't Say No Until I Finish Talking, executive produced by Steven Spielberg. Zanuck watched the film three days before he died. He also wrote, directed and produced the TCM/Amblin Television series A Night at the Movies. Episodes include George Lucas and the World of Fantasy Cinema, The Horrors of Stephen King, Hollywood Goes to Washington, The Gigantic World of Epics, The Suspenseful World of Thrillers, Merry Christmas!, and Cops & Robbers and Crime Writers.

Laurent Bouzereau is the co-founder of Nedland Media, with his partner Markus Keith.  Together, they are developing narrative films, TV series and documentaries.

Filmography

Documentaries 

 Don't Say No Until I Finish Talking: The Story of Richard D. Zanuck (2013)
 Steven Spielberg & John Williams: The Adventure Continues (2017)
 Five Came Back (2017)
Natalie Wood: What Remains Behind (2019)
Mama's Boy: A Story From Our Americas (2022)

Television 

 A Night at the Movies: The Gigantic World of Epics (2009) 
 A Night at the Movies: The Suspenseful World of Thrillers (2009) 
 A Night at the Movies: The Horrors of Stephen King (2011) 
 A Night at the Movies: Merry Christmas! (2011)
 A Night at the Movies: Hollywood Goes To Washington (2012)
 A Night at the Movies: Cops & Robbers and Crime Writers (2013)
 A Night at the Movies: George Lucas and the World of Fantasy Cinema (2014)

Behind-the-Scenes Documentaries (selected titles) 

Steven Spielberg
 West Side Story (2021)
 The Fabelmans (2022)
 Duel
 Jaws
 Close Encounters of the Third Kind
 1941
 Raiders of the Lost Ark
 Indiana Jones and the Temple of Doom
 Indiana Jones and the Last Crusade
 Indiana Jones and the Kingdom of the Crystal Skull
 E.T.: The Extra-Terrestrial
 The Color Purple
 Jurassic Park
 The Lost World: Jurassic Park
 Saving Private Ryan
 A.I. Artificial Intelligence
 Minority Report
 Catch Me If You Can
 The Terminal
 War of the Worlds
 Munich
 The Adventures of Tintin
 War Horse
 Lincoln
 Bridge of Spies
 The BFG
 The Post
 Ready Player One
Alfred Hitchcock
 Blackmail
 Foreign Correspondent
 Suspicion
 Shadow of a Doubt
 Rope
 Stage Fright
 Strangers on a Train
 I Confess
 Dial M for Murder
 Rear Window
 To Catch a Thief
 The Trouble with Harry
 The Man Who Knew Too Much
 The Wrong Man
 Psycho
 The Birds
 Marnie
 Torn Curtain
 Topaz
 Frenzy
 Family Plot
 Alfred Hitchcock Presents
David Lean
 The Bridge on the River Kwai
 Lawrence of Arabia
 Doctor Zhivago 
 Ryan's Daughter
Brian de Palma
 Carrie
 Obsession 
 Dressed to Kill
 Scarface
 Body Double
 The Untouchables
 Casualties of War
 Carlito's Way
 Femme Fatale
 The Black Dahlia
William Friedkin
 The Exorcist
 Cruising
 The Boys in the Band
 Bug
Martin Scorsese
 Taxi Driver
 Raging Bull
 Cape Fear
 Casino
Robert Zemeckis
 Back to the Future (franchise)
Sidney Lumet
 Serpico
 Dog Day Afternoon
 Murder on the Orient Express
 Network
 Prince of the City
Peter Bogdanovich
 Targets
 The Last Picture Show
 Paper Moon
 Daisy Miller
François Truffaut
 Fahrenheit 451
 Day for Night
Francis Ford Coppola
 The Godfather Collection
Roman Polanski
 Chinatown
 Tess
 Oliver Twist
 The Ghost Writer
Walter Hill
 The Warriors
Warren Beatty
 Reds
Arthur Penn
 Bonnie and Clyde
Cecil B. DeMille
 The Ten Commandments
William Wyler
 Ben-Hur
John Boorman
 Deliverance
Lawrence Kasdan
 The Big Chill
 Silverado
 Body Heat
 Dreamcatcher
George Lucas
 American Graffiti
Elia Kazan
 A Streetcar Named Desire
John Carpenter
 Christine
David Cronenberg
 The Dead Zone
Orson Welles
 The Lady from Shanghai
 Touch of Evil
John Millus
 Conan the Barbarian
Mel Brooks
 The Producers
Robert Wise
 The Andromeda Strain
Jeannot Szwarc
 Somewhere in Time
James Bridges
 The China Syndrome
Joe Dante
 Gremlins
Mel Gibson
 Braveheart
Gary Ross
 Seabiscuit
Terrence Malick
 The Tree of Life
Sean Penn
 Into the Wild
Steve McQueen
 12 Years a Slave
Lasse Hallström
 The Hundred-Foot Journey
Sam Taylor Johnson
 Fifty Shades of Grey
Colin Trevorrow
 Jurassic World
J.J. Abrams
 Star Wars: The Force Awakens
Rupert Sanders
 Ghost in the Shell (2017)
Matt Reeves
 War for the Planet of the Apes
Kenneth Branagh
 Murder on the Orient Express (2017)
J.A. Bayona
 Jurassic World: Fallen Kingdom
James Gray
 Ad Astra
Felix Van Groeningen
 Beautiful Boy
Mike Flanagan
 Doctor Sleep (2019)
Miguel Sapochnik
 Finch

Bibliography
 The De Palma Cut: The Film of America's Most Controversial Director (1988)
 The Alfred Hitchcock Quote Book (1993)
 The Cutting Room Floor: Movie Scenes Which Never Made It To The Screen (1994) 
 Ultraviolent Movies: From Sam Peckinpah to Quentin Tarantino (1996)
 Star Wars: The Annotated Screenplays (1997)
 The Making of Star Wars, Episode I – The Phantom Menace (1999) (Co-author with Jody Duncan) 
 E.T.: The Extra-Terrestrial: From Concept to Classic (2002) (Contributor) 
 Alma Hitchcock: The Woman Behind The Man (2003) (Co-author with Pat Hitchcock O'Connell)
 The Art of Bond: From Storyboard to Screen (2006)
 The Complete Making of Indiana Jones: The Definitive Story Behind All Four Films (2008) (Co-author with J.W. Rinzler)
 Hitchcock, Piece By Piece (2010)
 Steven Spielberg's War Horse (2011) (Contributor) 
 Lincoln, A Steven Spielberg Film: A Cinematic and Historical Companion (2012) (Contributor)
 West Side Story: The Making of the Steven Spielberg Film (2021)
 Steven Spielberg: The First Ten Years (2022)

Awards

References

External links
 Nedland Media 
 

Living people
American film directors
American documentary filmmakers
Film directors from Paris
Subtitlers
Year of birth missing (living people)